The Futurity Stakes is a Melbourne Racing Club Group 1 weight-for-age Thoroughbred horse race for horses three years old and older, over a distance of 1400 metres held at Caulfield Racecourse in Melbourne, Australia, in late February. Total prize money is A$750,000.

History

From 2006 until 2010 it was the first leg of the Asian Mile Challenge series, and its distance was changed to 1600 metres (1 mile). The race distance was reverted in 2011.

Distance
1898–1972 - 7 furlongs (1408.176 metres)
1973–1978 – 1400 metres
1979 – 1800 metres
1989–1995 – 1400 metres
1996 – 1411 metres
1997–2005 – 1400 metres
2006–2010 – 1600 metres 
2011 onwards - 1400 metres

Venue
During World War II the event was held at Flemington Racecourse.
In 1996 the event was held at Flemington Racecourse due to reconstruction of Caulfield Racecourse.  
In 2023 the race was run at Sandown Racecourse.

1933 & 1948 racebooks

Gallery of noted winners

Winners

1898 - Resolute
1899 - Bobadil
1900 - Palmer
1901 - Aurous
1902 - Sir Foote
1903 - Sir Leonard
1904 - Playaway
1905 - Gladsome
1906 - Gladsome
1907 - Corroboree
1908 - Antonio
1909 - Soultline
1910 - Comedy King
1911 - Blairgour
1912 - Popinjay
1913 - Eudorus
1914 - Brattle
1915 - Flash Of Steel
1916 - Maharajah
1917 - Balarang
1918 - Wedge
1919 - Lucknow
1920 - Gold Tie
1921 - ‡race not held
1922 - Eurythmic
1923 - Salatis
1924 - The Hawk
1925 - Father's Voice
1926 - Top Gallant
1927 - Waranton
1928 - Gothic
1929 - Mollison
1930 - Amounis
1931 - Phar Lap
1932 - Ammon Ra
1933 - Winooka
1934 - Waltzing Lily
1935 - Heros / Synagogue
1936 - Regular Bachelor
1937 - Gold Rod
1938 - Ajax
1939 - Ajax
1940 - Ajax
1941 - High Caste
1942 - Burrabil
1943 - Zonda
1944 - Counsel
1945 - Drum Net
1946 - Bernborough
1947 - Attley
1948 - Royal Gem
1949 - St. Razzle
1950 - St. Razzle
1951 - Iron Duke
1952 - San Domenico
1953 - Bob Cherry
1954 - Sir Isfahan
1955 - Prince Cortauld
1956 - The Orb
1957 - Parvo
1958 - Zariba
1959 - Lord
1960 - Todman
1961 - Sky High
1962 - Aquanita
1963 - Wenona Girl
1964 - Future
1965 - Sir Dane
1966 - Star Affair
1967 - Cendrillon
1968 - Prince Romantic
1969 - Magic Ruler
1970 - Crewman
1971 - Silver Spade
1972 - Gunsynd
1973 - Idolou
1974 - Idolou
1975 - Martindale
1976 - King's Helmet
1977 - Bonfield
1978 - Always Welcome
1979 - Manikato
1980 - Manikato
1981 - Manikato
1982 - Galleon
1983 - Manikato
1984 - Red Tempo
1985 - Vite Cheval
1986 - Campaign King
1987 - Rubiton
1988 - Vo Rogue
1989 - Zeditave
1990 - Ark Regal
1991 - Redelva
1992 - Mannerism
1993 - Schillaci
1994 - Primacy
1995 - Schillaci
1996 - Star Dancer
1997 - Mouawad
1998 - Encounter
1999 - Rustic Dream
2000 - Testa Rossa
2001 - †Desert Sky / Mr. Murphy
2002 - Dash For Cash
2003 - Yell
2004 - Reset
2005 - Regal Roller
2006 - Fields Of Omagh
2007 - Aqua D'Amore
2008 - Niconero
2009 - Niconero
2010 - Typhoon Tracy
2011 - More Joyous
2012 - King Mufhasa
2013 - All Too Hard
2014 - Moment Of Change
2015 - Suavito 
2016 - Turn Me Loose
2017 - Black Heart Bart 
2018 - Brave Smash 
2019 - Alizee 
2020 - Streets Of Avalon
 2021 - Probabeel
 2022 - Sierra Sue
 2023 - Alligator Blood

† Dead heat
‡ An embargo on Melbourne racing was in force by the Victorian Cabinet

See also
 List of Australian Group races
 Group races

References

Group 1 stakes races in Australia
Caulfield Racecourse